Raymond Bilcliff (24 May 1931 – 10 March 2009) was an English professional footballer who played in the Football League for Hartlepools United and Middlesbrough.

References

1931 births
2009 deaths
English footballers
Association football defenders
English Football League players
Middlesbrough F.C. players
Hartlepool United F.C. players